Kardar Kola (also Romanized as Kardar Kolā; also known as Kār Degar Kolā, Kār Der Kolā, Kārdgar Kalā, and Kārdgar Kolā) is a village in Deraz Kola Rural District, Babol Kenar District, Babol County, Mazandaran Province, Iran. At the 2006 census, its population was 546, in 167 families.

References 

Populated places in Babol County